Tučín is a municipality and village in Přerov District in the Olomouc Region of the Czech Republic. It has about 400 inhabitants.

Notable people
Tomáš Eduard Šilinger (1866–1913), politician and journalist

References

Villages in Přerov District